Dua Kumayl is a dua or supplication attributed to Ali, the cousin and son-in-law of the Islamic prophet Muhammad, who taught it to his companion, Kumayl ibn Ziyad. This supplication is used by Muslims to ward off evil and is particularly well-known among Shia Muslims. The latter regard Ali as their first Imam and the designated successor of Muhammad.

Historical details 
According to the Shia scholar Majlesi, Kumayl ibn Ziyad, a confidant of Ali, attended a sermon in Basra by Ali in which he mentioned the night before mid-Sha'ban. In his sermon, Ali said
"There is no worshiper who stays awake through this night and recites the prayer of al-Khidr who will not have his prayer answered."

After the sermon, Kumayl expressed his interest in learning this dua and Ali dictated it to him. Ali then advised Kumayl to recite this dua on the eve of every Friday, or once a month, or, at least, once a year to ward off evil and receive divine blessings and forgiveness. 

Shia scholars Tusi and Ibn Tawus both record this prayer under the acts of worship for the night of mid-Sha'ban. In particular, Tusi refers to this prayer as dua al-Khidr and writes that Kumayl (possibly on a different occasion) saw Ali reciting this prayer while prostrating in worship.

Passages 

O He in whose hand is my forelock!

O He who knows my affliction and my misery!

O He who is aware of my poverty and indigence!

My Lord! My Lord! My Lord!

I ask You by Your Truth and Your Holiness

And the greatest of Your Attributes and Names,

That You make my times in the night and the day inhabited by Your remembrance,

And joined to Your service

And my deeds acceptable to You,

So that my deeds and my litanies may all be a single litany

And my occupation with Your service everlasting.

...

...

And protect me with Your mercy!

And make my tongue remember You without ceasing

And my heart enthralled by Your love!

And be gracious to me by answering me favorably,

And nullify my slips

And forgive my lapses!

...

...

O He, whose satisfaction is quickly achieved!

Forgive him who owns nothing but supplication

For You do what You will

O He whose Name is a remedy,

And whose remembrance is a cure,

And whose obedience is wealth!

Have mercy upon him whose main wealth is hopefulness

And whose weapon is weeping!

See also

 Shia view of Ali
 Dua Ahd
 Dua Nudba
 Dua al-Faraj
 Jawshan Saqeer
 Dua al-Sabah

References

External links
Dua Kumayl (English translation)
Dua Kumayl (English translation)
Dua Kumayl (recitation)

Shia Islam
Islamic terminology
Islamic prayer
Shia prayers